Road Rovers is an American animated television series produced by Warner Bros. Animation that premiered on Kids' WB on September 7, 1996, and ended after one season on February 22, 1997. It was later shown on Cartoon Network from February 7, 1998, until 2000.

The show follows the adventures of the Road Rovers, a team of five super-powered crime-fighting anthropomorphic dogs, known as "cano-sapiens". The characters all live with world leaders, including the President of the United States, the British Prime Minister, the Chancellor of Germany and the Swiss President, with one dog living in the Kremlin.

Plot
In the town of Socorro, New Mexico, Professor Shepherd was forced to relinquish an experimental transdogmafier technology to General Parvo in exchange for his lost dog, but instead Parvo gives him a bomb that destroys his laboratory. One year later, as normal dogs begin to mutate into monsters, Shephard, who miraculously survived the attack, takes measures to stop Parvo who is behind this.

Shepherd selects five different dogs and in his new, secret underground lab, he uses his new transdogmifier on the five, turning them into "Cano-sapiens". These dogs are the pets of world leaders and when called to action they are a team of crime fighters known as the "Road Rovers".

Characters
Hunter (Jess Harnell): A Goldador from the United States and the leader of the team. Hunter is optimistic, funny, devoted, friendly, level-headed, and an effective leader. Hunter's power is super speed; this allows him to run faster than the speed of sound. He lives with President Bill Clinton in the White House. He also has a flirtatious relationship with Colleen in the later episodes of the series, which the latter reciprocates.
Colleen (Tress MacNeille): A no-nonsense Rough Collie from the United Kingdom, and the only female member of the Road Rovers. She is the coordinator of the team, always checking to see if everything is going well without any problems or issues. Colleen is also very athletic, being a skilled martial artist. She currently resides with the prime minister of the United Kingdom, John Major and his wife Norma Johnson. She is openly attracted to Hunter, with whom she developed a flirtatious relationship during later episodes of the series. She was turned into a werewolf after getting attacked by werewolves she and the team were fighting in London and was later turned back to normal by the swamp water.
Exile (Kevin Michael Richardson): A Siberian Husky from Russia. His full name is Exilo Michalovitch Sanhusky. Exile speaks English with a thick Russian accent, sometimes mixing up words in the process (ex: "Aprilday" instead of "Mayday", "Jingle balls" instead of "Jingle bells"). He is friendly and easygoing, but often clashes with Blitz. Exile is super strong and also has heat, ice, and night vision. He used to work with other huskies as a sled dog, but now lives with the president of Russia Boris Yeltsin. Exile and Blitz shared a running gag in which Blitz would make a comment that could be interpreted in various ways, to which Exile would reprimand Blitz for being a "weird boy".
Blitz (Jeff Bennett): A Doberman from Germany. Unlike Hunter, Blitz is often selfish, immature, spiteful, faint-hearted, and has an ill temper. He has razor-sharp claws and strong jaws, which allow him to bite and cut through almost any substance. Blitz was formerly a guard dog for thieves, but now lives with the chancellor of Germany, Helmut Kohl. Blitz attempts to flirt with Colleen several times over the series, part of a running gag in which his flirting is met with her pretending not to know who Blitz is. This joke ran up until the series' final episode, at which point she finally acknowledges Blitz by name.
Shag (Frank Welker): A cowardly Old English Sheepdog from Switzerland. Shag only transformed halfway into a Cano-sapien. He walks like a human, but speaks in a half-dog, half-human dialect. In addition to this, he does not wear a uniform, instead remaining in his natural state. Like Exile, Shag is super strong, and also his hair can store a lot of things like weapons and random items. He lived in a valley with a flock of sheep, but now lives with Arnold Koller, the president of the Swiss Confederation. Despite his strength and ability to store extreme amounts of weaponry, Shag is extremely fearful, and often hides behind the other Rovers when confronted by danger.
Muzzle (Frank Welker): A shy but kind, sweet, lovable and curious Rottweiler. Muzzle was once "Scout", Professor Shepherd's dog that was kidnapped. He was never transformed into a Cano-sapien, but instead became aggressive due to Parvo's failed experiment on him. Due to this aggression, he is often restrained on a cart while wearing a straitjacket and mask. 
Persia (Sheena Easton): An Afghan Hound and commander of the Space Rovers.
Professor Hubert (David Doyle): A Bloodhound scientist.
Confusus: A wise dog in the mountains.
Professor William F. Shepherd "The Master" (Joseph Campanella): The geneticist behind the transdogmafier and the Road Rovers. He's the master of the Road Rovers, and the one who selected each of them. Without him, the world would have been ruled by the cano-mutants led by Parvo.
General Parvo (Jim Cummings): The Road Rovers' main antagonist who is out to destroy Professor Shepherd and conquer the world. He has a permanent cough. It was revealed later in the series that General Parvo was at one time a Cat before being transformed into a "Feline Sapien", which resemble humans a great deal more than Shepherd's Cano-sapiens. He shares a very similar appearance to wrestler Hulk Hogan. The name Parvo derives from a canine disease which often kills puppies.
The Groomer (Sheena Easton): The Groomer is the mostly loyal assistant to General Parvo. She's generally armed with a portable hair clipper, though she uses other equipment if it's appropriate. 
Cano-mutants: Dogs turned into humanoid monsters and led by Parvo.
Werewolves: A pack of werewolves appearing in "A Hair of the Dog That Bit You" that turned Colleen into one and were restored by Hunter with the swamp water.

Episodes

Series overview

Season 1 (1996-1997)

Home media
A multi-region DVD of the entire series was announced on February 4, 2015, by Warner Archive and was released on February 10, 2015. All of the episodes can be purchased digitally on Amazon Prime, Google Play Movies and TV, Apple TV, and YouTube.

In popular culture
Hunter made a cameo appearance as a background statue in The Sylvester & Tweety Mysteries fourth season premiere episode, "The Stilted Perch / A Game of Cat and Monster!".

The Road Rovers made a cameo appearance in the Teen Titans Go! sixth-season episode, "Huggbees".

References

External links

 

1990s American animated television series
1996 American television series debuts
1997 American television series endings
American children's animated action television series
American children's animated adventure television series
American children's animated comedy television series
American children's animated superhero television series
American time travel television series
English-language television shows
Dog superheroes
Animated television series about dogs
Kids' WB original shows
The WB original programming
Television series created by Tom Ruegger
Television series by Warner Bros. Animation
Television superheroes
Television shows set in New Mexico
1990s American time travel television series
Cultural depictions of Bill Clinton